Shanderman Rural District is a rural district (dehestan) in Shanderman District, Masal County, Gilan Province, Iran. Most of the residents here speaks Talysh language. At the 2006 census, its population was 11,224, in 2,745 families. The rural district has 40 villages.

Administrative Divisions 
Below is a list of settlements under Shanderman Rural District:

 Anbara-Dul
 Anjilan
 Bitam
 Boneh Sara
 Boruj Rah
 Chaleh Sara
 Chapeh Zad
 Chay Khaleh
 Chit Bon
 Churk Muzan
 Deran
 Galu Kuh
 Gaskaminjan
 Emamzadeh Shafi
 Hajji Bijar va Jas Ganas
 Kharf Kureh
 Kuban
 Kofud
 Kofud Mozhdeh
 Khoshkeh Darya
 Lal Kan
 Latest
 Lachur
 Masheh Kah
 Moaf
 Nilash
 Owlom
 Palang Sara
 Panga Posht
 Pashed
 Pashkam
 Razin Dul
 Shalekeh
 Siyakh-Kuh
 Siah Mard
 Talab Darreh
 Vezmtar
 Zarabcheh
 Zard Dul

References 

Rural Districts of Gilan Province
Masal County